The Barngarla, formerly known as Parnkalla and also known as Pangkala, are an Aboriginal people of the Port Lincoln, Whyalla and Port Augusta areas. The Barngarla are the traditional owners of much of Eyre Peninsula, South Australia.

Language 

Barngarla died out in the 1960s.

Israeli linguist Professor Ghil'ad Zuckermann contacted the Barngarla community in 2011 proposing to revive it, the project of reclamation being accepted enthusiastically by people of Barngarla descent. Workshops to this end were started in Port Lincoln, Whyalla and Port Augusta in 2012. The reclamation is based on 170-year-old documents.

Country
The western reaches extended as far as Island Lagoon and Yardea. Woorakimba, Hesso, Yudnapinna, and the Gawler Ranges are formed part of Barngarla lands. The southern frontier lay Kimba, Darke Peak, Cleve, and Franklin Harbour.

Social organisation
The Barngarla had two tribal divisions: the northern Wartabanggala ranged from north of Port Augusta to Ogden Hill and the vicinity of Quorn and Beltana; a southern branch, the Malkaripangala, lived down the western side of the Spencer Gulf. Referred to as Pangkala, the Barngala have also been included in the grouping currently known as the Adnyamathanha people.

In 1844 the missionary C. W. Schürmann stated that the Barngarla were divided into two classes, the Mattiri and Karraru. This was criticized by the ethnographer R. H. Mathews, who, surveying South Australian tribes, argued that Schürmann had mixed them up, and that the proper divisions, which he called phratries shared by all these tribes was as follows:

The Barngarla practised both circumcision and subincision.

Culture 
A practice known as "singing to the sharks" was an important ritual in Barngarla culture, a technique that expired when its last traditional practitioner died in the 1960s. The performance consisted of men lining the cliffs of bays in the Eyre peninsula and singing out, while their chants were accompanied by women dancing on the beach. The aim was to enlist sharks and dolphins in driving shoals of fish towards the shore where fishers in the shallows could make their catch.

History of contact
Even before British colonisation, the Barngarla were under pressure from the Kokatha, who were on the move southwards, forcing the Barngarla to retreat from their traditional northern boundaries. One effect was to cut off their access to certain woods used in spear-making, so that they finally had to forage as far as Tumby Bay to get supplies of whipstick mallee ash.

Barngarla native title 
On 22 January 2015 the Barngarla people were granted native title over much of Eyre Peninsula.

On 24 September 2021 they were granted native title over the city of Port Augusta, after a protracted 25-year old battle. Justice Natalie Charlesworth presided over the sitting.

Alternative names
 Arkaba-tura (men of Arkaba, a toponym
 Bangala, Bungela
 Banggala, Bahngala
 Bungeha
 Jadliaura people
 Kooapidna
 Kooapudna (Franklin Harbour horde)
 Kortabina (toponym)
 Pamkala
 Pankalla, Parnkalla, Parn-kal-la, Pankarla
 Punkalla
 Punkirla
 Wanbirujurari ("men of the seacoast", northern tribal term for southern hordes)
 Willara
 Willeuroo ("west"/ "westerner")

Some words
 babi "father"
 gadalyili, goonya, walgara "shark"
 goordnidi "native dog"
 ngami "mother"
 wilga "domesticated dog"

Barngarla has four grammatical numbers: singular, dual, plural and superplural. For instance:
 wárraidya "emu" (singular)
 wárraidyailyarranha "a lot of emus", "heaps of emus" (superplural)
 wárraidyalbili "two emus" (dual)
 wárraidyarri "emus" (plural)

Notes

Citations

Sources

External links 
 Barngarla: People, Language & Land
 An interview with Stolen Generation Barngarla man Howard Richards and his wife Isabel / Port Lincoln
 Bibliography of Parnkalla language and people resources, at the Australian Institute of Aboriginal and Torres Strait Islander Studies

Aboriginal peoples of South Australia
Language revival
Port Augusta
Whyalla